LONGi Green Energy Technology Co. Ltd. or LONGi Group, formerly Xi'an Longi Silicon Materials Corporation, is a Chinese photovoltaics company, a major manufacturer of solar modules and a developer of solar power projects. 

LONGi is the world's largest manufacturer of monocrystalline silicon wafers and is listed on the Shanghai Stock Exchange.

History 

Subsidiaries and acquisitions 
 LERRI Solar Technology Co., Ltd., (a.k.a. LERRI Photovoltaic Technology, also LERRI Solar), was acquired by LONGi in 2014.
 LONGi Solar

Operations 
LONGI Silicon Materials is engaged in the research, manufacture and distribution of monocrystalline ingots.  It is the world's largest monocrystalline silicon manufacturer, and has rapidly broken world solar efficiency records three times within five months.  Fast Company listed Xi'an LONGi Silicon Materials one among "Most Innovative Companies 2013" "for supplying the solar industry with high-quality silicon wafers at low cost". LONGi Solar, a subsidiary of LONGI Green Energy Technology, recently achieved a new industry record with 23.6% conversion efficiency with its P-type monocrystalline PERC (passivated emitter rear cell) solar cells, toward which an increasing number of manufacturers worldwide are migrating. The technique involves taking a silicon wafer, typically 1 to 2 mm thick, and making a multitude of parallel, transverse slices across the wafer, creating a large number of slivers that have a thickness of 50 micrometres and a width equal to the thickness of the original wafer. These slices are rotated 90 degrees, so that the surfaces corresponding to the faces of the original wafer become the edges of the slivers. The result is to convert, for example, a 150 mm diameter, 2 mm-thick wafer having an exposed silicon surface area of about 175 cm2 per side into about 1000 slivers having dimensions of 100 mm × 2 mm × 0.1 mm, yielding a total exposed silicon surface area of about 2000 cm2 per side.  The electrical doping and contacts that had been on the face of the wafer are now located at the edges of the sliver, rather than at the front and rear as in the case of conventional wafer cells, as a result of this rotation.  This results in making the cell sensitive on both sides, from both the front and rear of the cell (a property known as bifaciality). Such results need to be certified by a reliable and trusted external agency, and this accomplishment has been analysed and certified by China's National Center of Supervision and Inspection on Solar Photovoltaic Product Quality (CPVT).

LONGi claimed in October 2017 that they had achieved the record for a monocrystalline solar cell with a conversion efficiency (23.6%) higher than previously thought possible for a PERC cell. In early 2018 they announced a new efficiency record of 23.6%.

In December 2017, LONGi reported a record bifaciality reading of 82.15% for its "Hi-MO2" mono PERC bifacial module. The company's strategic plan is to triple its capacity to produce monocrystalline ingots and wafers to 45 GW by 2020.

Longi Silicon is a member of the Silicon Module Super League (SMSL), which had been a group of big-six c-Si module suppliers in the solar PV industry today until Longi was admitted. The other six members of the SMSL group are Canadian Solar, Hanwha Q CELLS, JA Solar, Jinko Solar, Trina Solar, and GCL.

Longi Silicon has been listed on the Shanghai Stock Exchange (security code: 601012) since April 2012.

LONGi has been called the fastest growing PV manufacturer in the industry.  LONGi annual revenue in 2013 was derived entirely from selling around US$330 million of mono c-Si wafers, but by 2016 that annual revenue had skyrocketed to approximately US$1.67 billion.  That was a nearly 94% increase over the 2015 fiscal year, which had itself generated a revenue growth of around 61% over the year before.

LONGi has manufacturing plants in Mainland China, India and Malaysia, and has acquired production facilities from other companies, including from American manufacturer SunEdison. However, Photon.Info reports that Longi Green Energy is mulling an open manufactory in the USA. Further, in a lengthy article in PV Magazine Longi Silicon and Zhonghuan Semiconductor announce their shared plans for over 10 GW of new expansion of additional capacity increases for their mono-crystalline products.

In March 2018, LONGi announced an agreement to develop a major solar manufacturing hub in the Kingdom of Saudi Arabia (KSA) to support the Kingdom's plans to install 200 GW of solar power plants.  Their "Solar-for-Solar" strategy for this development is historic in that it avoids the long smokestack criticism by "building the manufacturing plants that would be powered entirely by solar energy to provide the lowest manufacturing carbon footprint."

Products 
 P/N-type Mono-crystalline silicon wafer
 P/N-type Mono-crystalline ingots
 Bifacial solar cells

References

External links 
 

Solar energy companies of China
Photovoltaics manufacturers
Manufacturing companies based in Xi'an
Manufacturing companies established in 2006
Renewable resource companies established in 2006
Energy in China
Science and technology in the People's Republic of China
Silicon photonics
Silicon wafer producers
Crystals
Solar power in China
Chinese brands
Chinese companies established in 2006